is a Japanese anime television series consisting of 26 episodes, based on the novel Monarch, The Big Bear of Tallac by Ernest Thompson Seton. It was directed by Yoshio Kuroda and was first broadcast on Asahi Broadcasting Corporation in 1977.

References

External links
 
 

Animated television series about bears
1977 anime television series debuts
Asahi Broadcasting Corporation original programming
Fictional Native American people
Books about bears

Ernest Thompson Seton